Fís Éireann / Screen Ireland, formerly known as Bord Scannán na hÉireann / the Irish Film Board, is the Republic of Ireland's state development agency for the Irish film, television and animation industry. It provides funds for the development, production and distribution of feature films, feature documentaries, short films, TV animation series and TV drama series.

History
The Irish Film Board (IFB) originally ran from 1980 to 1987. During this period it produced or co-produced Eat the Peach, Anne Devlin, The Outcasts (1982), and Angel. After its closure, the success of several externally funded Irish films, such as My Left Foot, The Crying Game and The Commitments, motivated local lobbyists to push for its re-establishment, which occurred in 1993. The board was reconstituted under the chairmanship of Lelia Doolan in 1993 by the Minister for Arts, Culture and the Gaeltacht, Michael D. Higgins, who said "The whole reasoning behind my decision to develop the industry by means of a two-pronged approach – namely, the reactivation of the Irish Film Board and my proposals in relation to independent television production contained in the Broadcasting Authority (Amendment) Bill 1993 – is precisely to exploit the technical facilities available in Ireland at present and the imaginative and creative skills which exist in that industry which have been underemployed".

Fís Éireann/Screen Ireland
On 10 April 2018, at a press conference for the publication of Investing in our Culture, Language and Heritage 2018–2027 (published as part of Project Ireland 2040), Minister for Culture, Heritage and the Gaeltacht, Josepha Madigan, announced that from 18 June 2018, the agency would become known as Fís Éireann/Screen Ireland. The decision to change the name of the agency was announced in 2015, by Minister for Arts, Heritage and the Gaeltacht, Heather Humphreys who said that the name-change "recognises the body’s increasing interests beyond the world of cinema and reminds us how, in this digital age, 'film-makers' now rarely work in the medium of 'film'".

International recognition
From 1993 to 2004, the organisation supported an indigenous industry which produced over 100 feature films. Irish film talent was recognized internationally and industry collaboration of Irish producers, writers and directors was well underway producing such work as Ailsa (1993), I Went Down (1997), About Adam (1999), Disco Pigs (2000), Bloody Sunday (2002), Intermission (2003), The Magdalene Sisters (2003), Omagh (2004), Man About Dog (2004), Adam & Paul (2004), Breakfast on Pluto (2005), The Wind that Shakes the Barley (2006) Once (2007), Garage (2007), The Secret of Kells (2009), His & Hers (2009) The Guard (2011), Albert Nobbs (2012), What Richard Did (2012), The Stag (2014), Calvary (2014), Song of the Sea (2014), The Lobster (2015), Brooklyn (2015) and Room (2015).

Notable Irish box office successes for Irish film include Intermission which grossed over €2 million at Irish box office in 2003, Man About Dog which in 2004 grossed over €2.5 million at the Irish box office, The Guard which grossed over €18 million at the international box office and Brooklyn which had earned over €2 million at the Irish box office and €11 million at the US box office as of December 2015.

IFB-funded productions to have featured at major international awards include Six Shooter (Best Live Action Short Film, Academy Awards 2006), The Wind that Shakes the Barley (Palme d’Or, Cannes Film Festival 2006), Once (Best Original Song, Academy Awards 2008), The Secret of Kells (nominated for Best Animated Feature, Academy Awards 2010), Mea Maxima Culpa: Silence in the House of God (Exceptional Merit in documentary Filmmaking, Emmy Awards 2013), Song of the Sea (nominated for Best Animated Feature, Academy Awards 2015), The Lobster (Jury Prize, Cannes Film Festival 2015), Room (People's Choice Award, Toronto International Film Festival 2015), The Killing of a Sacred Deer, and The Breadwinner (Academy Awards nomination).

International production
From 1994 to 2004 there were high levels of international film production choosing the Republic of Ireland as a location for filming as a result of the Irish tax incentive for film and television Section 35, which became Section 481 of the Taxes Consolidated Act, in 1999. Ireland introduced a film production tax incentive making Ireland more competitive for film production than its international competitors. As a result of the high levels of incoming production into Ireland, the craft and skills base of Irish crews improved, and was then also available to work on Irish films. Major international films shot in Ireland during this period include Braveheart and Reign of Fire.

In the 21st century, Ireland has become the base for a number of high-end international TV dramas including The Tudors (2007-2010), Ripper Street (2012 – 2016), Penny Dreadful (2014 – 2016), Vikings (2013 – present), Into the Badlands (2017 – present), and Nightflyers (2018 – present).

Animation
The agency did not initially have a policy of funding animation. In 1991, a group of animators and animation students established the Anamú Animation Base, promoting the growth of independent Irish animation. Along with other groups, Anamú successfully lobbied for the film board to support animation projects. From the late 1990s, the film board has provided support to Ireland's animation industry.

Board
As of 2017, the board was chaired by Annie Doona, the president of Dún Laoghaire Institute of Art, Design and Technology, where the National Film School is located. At that time, the board also consisted of producer Katie Holly, the managing director of Blinder Films; Larry Bass, founder and CEO of ShinAwil Productions; Mark Fenton, founder and CEO of Masf Consulting; Rachel Lysaght, founder and lead creative producer of Underground Films; Kate McColgan, producer and managing director of Calico Productions and Marian Quinn, writer, director and founder of Janey Pictures.

Funding

Screen Ireland operates under the aegis of Department of Tourism, Culture, Arts, Gaeltacht, Sport and Media. Its annual budget is decided by Dáil Éireann and had a total capital budget of €14.03 million in 2015. Screen Ireland provides funds for the development, production and distribution of feature films, feature documentaries, short films, TV animation series and TV drama series.

Selected filmography
 Never Grow Old
 She's Missing
 Black 47
 The Killing of a Sacred Deer
 The Breadwinner
 Wolfwalkers
 The Man Who Invented Christmas
 Sing Street
 Room
 Brooklyn
 The Lobster
 What Richard Did
 Song of the Sea
 The Hardy Bucks Movie
 Calvary
 The Wind That Shakes the Barley
 Once
 Parked
 What If
 The Guard (2011)
 The Last Days on Mars (2013)
 Stitches
 Niko & The Way to the Stars
 32A; funding
 Between the Canals
 Inside I'm Dancing
 Wake Wood
 Outcast
 The Revolution Will Not Be Televised; funding
 The Secret of Kells
 Grabbers

See also

Cinema of Ireland
Television in the Republic of Ireland
List of Irish films

References

External links
Official Website
Irish Filmboard at IMDb

Film organisations in Ireland
State-owned film companies
1980 establishments in Ireland
Peabody Award winners
Organizations established in 1980